Stuart Young-Black (born 21 July 1959) is a Canadian equestrian. He competed at the 1992 Summer Olympics and the 1996 Summer Olympics.

References

External links
 

1959 births
Living people
Canadian male equestrians
Olympic equestrians of Canada
Equestrians at the 1992 Summer Olympics
Equestrians at the 1996 Summer Olympics
Equestrians at the 1987 Pan American Games
Pan American Games medalists in equestrian
Pan American Games silver medalists for Canada
Sportspeople from Macclesfield
Medalists at the 1987 Pan American Games
21st-century Canadian people
20th-century Canadian people